The 1952 British Columbia general election was the 23rd general election in the Canadian province of British Columbia. It was held to elect members of the Legislative Assembly of British Columbia, alongside a plebiscite on daylight saving time and liquor. The election was called on April 10, 1952, and held on June 12, 1952. The new legislature met for the first time on February 3, 1953. 

It was the first BC general election to use a preferential ballot, a short-lived phenomenon in the province. The presence of multi-member districts, such as Victoria City with 3 MLAs, in conjunction with the alternative voting system called for an innovation where the district's candidates were split into three "ballots", each with one candidate from each party.

Due to the preferential ballot, the election resulted in a surprise victory for the new Social Credit Party. Not even the Socreds had expected to win the election; the party had no official leader, and was nominally lead through the election by Ernest George Hansell, an Alberta MP who did not contest a seat himself. The newly elected caucus selected W. A. C. Bennett, a former Conservative MLA, to be their leader and premier-designate.

This began what would be 20 years of uninterrupted Social Credit rule in British Columbia. This would also be the last election to produce a minority government until the 2017 election.

Background 
The government until not long before the election had been a Liberal–Progressive Conservative coalition (the Conservatives had recently changed their name to match that of the federal party). After the coalition had collapsed, the Liberals felt threatened by the rising popularity of the Co-operative Commonwealth Federation. To lock out the CCF, the government adopted the alternative voting system instead of leaving the existing system in place or switching to the single transferable vote system. While they ran candidates separately under their own names, Liberal and Conservative party leaders believed that if Liberal voters picked the local Tory candidate as their second preference and vice versa, one of the candidates of the two parties would have enough votes to be elected in many districts, hopefully ensuring the coalition's retention of power.

Campaign 
However, the Liberal and PC leaders had not reckoned on being so unpopular with the province's voters. The combined Liberal and PC vote total was 120,000 fewer votes than in the previous election, while the Social Credit party received almost 200,000 more votes than in 1949. The combined Liberal and Conservative vote totals surpassed 50 percent in only eight seat contests, so even if the party voters had adhered to coalition discipline, the coalition did not have enough votes to be elected in most of the districts. They received only a comparative few votes through vote transfers from CCF and SC candidates, whose supporters aided each other where possible.

In districts where CCF candidates were eliminated, back-up preferences were marked overwhelmingly for the British Columbia Social Credit League (BCSCL). Combined with many second-preference votes transferred from eliminated Liberal and Conservative candidates, this gave the Social Credit party five seats in addition to the 14 seats where its candidates had a plurality in the first counts. In the end, the Social Credit party captured 19 seats. The CCF received 18 seats, helped in many cases by transfers from eliminated SC candidates. The coalition was almost wiped out, winning only 10 seats between both parties. Both Premier Byron "Boss" Johnson and Tory leader Herbert Anscomb lost their seats.

Not even the Socreds had expected to win the election. The party had no official leader. Alberta Social Credit Member of Parliament Ernest George Hansell had led the party during the election campaign without contesting a seat himself. The Socreds persuaded Tom Uphill, a Labour member of the Legislature (MLA), to support the party, and so the Socreds were able to form a minority government. (Otherwise, having to provide the Speaker meant that the SC seat total would have been reduced to only the same as the CCF's seat count.)

Aftermath 
The party's next task was to choose the province's new premier. In a vote of the newly elected caucus, W.A.C. Bennett, a former Conservative MLA who joined the Socreds after losing a bid for the Tory leadership, won a caucus vote and became premier-designate on July 15, 1952. This began what would be 21 years of uninterrupted Social Credit rule in British Columbia. The party held power for 36 of the following 39 years. It would also be the last British Columbia election to produce a minority government until the 2017 election.

In hopes of getting a stronger mandate, Bennett deliberately lost a confidence vote in 1953. This forced an election in June 1953 in which Social Credit won a majority of the seats.

Results

Note:

* Party did not nominate candidates in the previous election.

1 In the previous election, the Liberal and Conservative parties ran candidates jointly as "Coalition" candidates, electing 39 MLAs. The Conservatives withdrew from the coalition in 1951 hastening the government's collapse.

Results by riding

|-
||    
|align="center"|William Ralph Talbot Chetwynd
|align="center"  |CaribooBC Social Credit League
||    
||    
|align="center"  |AlberniCo-operative Commonwealth Fed.
|align="center"|Stanley John Squire
||    
|-
||    
|align="center"|William Kenneth Kiernan
|align="center"  |ChilliwackBC Social Credit League
||    
||    
|align="center"  |AtlinCo-operative Commonwealth Fed.
|align="center"|Frank Calder
||    
|-
||    
|align="center"|Richard Orr Newton
|align="center"  |ColumbiaBC Social Credit League
||    
||    
|align="center"  |BurnabyCo-operative Commonwealth Fed.
|align="center"|Ernest Edward Winch
||    
|-
||    
|align="center"|Thomas Irwin
|align="center"  |DeltaBC Social Credit League
||    
||    
|align="center"  |ComoxCo-operative Commonwealth Fed.
|align="center"|William Campbell Moore
||    
|-
||    
|align="center"|Lyle Wicks
|align="center"  |DewdneyBC Social Credit League
||    
||    
|align="center"  |Cowichan-NewcastleCo-operative Commonwealth Fed.
|align="center"|Robert Martin Strachan
||    
|-
||    
|align="center"|Llewllyn Leslie King
|align="center"  |Fort GeorgeBC Social Credit League
||    
||    
|align="center"  |CranbrookCo-operative Commonwealth Fed.
|align="center"|Leo Thomas Nimsick
||    
|-
||    
|align="center"|Philip Arthur Gaglardi
|align="center"  |KamloopsBC Social Credit League
||    
||    
|align="center"  |EsquimaltCo-operative Commonwealth Fed.
|align="center"|Frank Mitchell
||    
|-
||    
|align="center"|Wesley Drewett Black
|align="center"  |Nelson-CrestonBC Social Credit League
||    
||    
|align="center"  |Grand Forks-GreenwoodCo-operative Commonwealth Fed.
|align="center"|Rupert Haggen
||    
|-
||    
|align="center"|Lorne Shantz
|align="center"  |North OkanaganBC Social Credit League
||    
||    
|align="center"  |Kaslo-SlocanCo-operative Commonwealth Fed.
|align="center"|Randolph Harding
||    
|-
||    
|align="center"|Cyril Morley Shelford
|align="center"  |OminecaBC Social Credit League
||    
||    
|align="center"  |MackenzieCo-operative Commonwealth Fed.
|align="center"|Anthony John Gargrave
||    
|-
||    
|align="center"|Charles William Parker
|align="center"  |Peace RiverBC Social Credit League
||    
||    
|align="center"  |New WestminsterCo-operative Commonwealth Fed.
|align="center"|Rae Eddie
||    
|-
||    
|align="center"|Robert Edward Sommers
|align="center"  |Rossland-TrailBC Social Credit League
||    
||    
|align="center"  |Prince RupertCo-operative Commonwealth Fed.
|align="center"|George Edwin Hills
||    
|-
||    
|align="center"|James Allan Reid
|align="center"  |Salmon ArmBC Social Credit League
||    
||    
|align="center"  |RevelstokeCo-operative Commonwealth Fed.
|align="center"|Vincent Segur
||    
|-
||    
|align="center"|Harry Denyer Francis
|align="center"  |SimilkameenBC Social Credit League
||    
||    
|align="center"  |SaanichCo-operative Commonwealth Fed.
|align="center"|Frank Snowsell
||    
|-
||    
|align="center"|William Andrew Cecil Bennett
|align="center"  |South OkanaganBC Social Credit League
||    
||    
|align="center" rowspan=2 |Vancouver CentreCo-operative Commonwealth Fed.
|align="center"|James Campbell Bury
||    
|-
||    
|align="center"|Eric Charles Fitzgerald Martin
|align="center" rowspan=2 |Vancouver-BurrardBC Social Credit League
||    
||    
|align="center"|Laura Emma Marshall Jamieson
||    
|-
||    
|align="center"|Bert Price
||    
||    
|align="center" rowspan=2 |Vancouver EastCo-operative Commonwealth Fed.
|align="center"|Arthur James Turner
||    
|-
||    
|align="center"|Tilly Rolston
|align="center" |Vancouver-Point GreyBC Social Credit League
||    
||    
|align="center"|Harold Edward Winch
||    
|-
||    
|align="center"|Irvine Finlay Corbett
|align="center" |YaleBC Social Credit League
||    
||    
|align="center"  |FernieLabour
|align="center"|Thomas Aubert Uphill
||    
|-
|
|
|
|
||    
|align="center"  |LillooetProgressive Conservative
|align="center"|Ernest Crawford Carson
||    
|-
|
|
|
|
||    
|align="center"  |Nanaimo and the IslandsProgressive Conservative
|align="center"|Larry Giovando
||    
|-
|
|
|
|
||    
|align="center" rowspan=2 |Vancouver-Point GreyProgressive Conservative
|align="center"|Albert Reginald MacDougall
||    
|-
|
|
|
|
||    
|align="center"|George Clark Miller
||    
|-
|
|
|
|
||    
|align="center"  |SkeenaLiberal
|align="center"|Edward Tourtellotte Kenney
||    
|-
|
|
|
|
||    
|align="center"  |North VancouverLiberal
|align="center"|Martin Elliott Sowden
||    
|-
|
|
|
|
||    
|align="center"  |Oak BayLiberal
|align="center"|Philip Archibald Gibbs
||    
|-
|
|
|
|
||    
|align="center" rowspan=3 |Victoria CityLiberal
|align="center"|Nancy Hodges
||    
|-
|
|
|
|
||    
|align="center"|Daniel John Proudfoot
||    
|-
|
|
|
|
||    
|align="center"|William Thomas Straith
||    
|-
|
|align="center"  |
|align="center"|
|-
|-
| align="center" colspan="10"|Source: Elections BC
|-
|}

See also
List of British Columbia political parties
History and usage of the Single Transferable Vote

References

Further reading
 

Elections in British Columbia
British Columbia
General election
British Columbia general election